Zimbabwe made its first appearance at a Deaflympic event in 1993, which is also the only time that Zimbabwe was eligible to participate at Deaflympics.

Zimbabwe sent a delegation consisting of just 2 Deaf sportspeople in the 1993 Summer Deaflympics.

See also
Zimbabwe at the Paralympics
Zimbabwe at the Olympics

References 

 
Deaf culture in Zimbabwe
Nations at the Deaflympics